Fiona Phillips (born 1 January 1961) is an English journalist, broadcaster and television presenter. She is best known for her presenting roles with the ITV Breakfast programme GMTV Today.

Early life
Phillips was born in Canterbury Hospital in Canterbury, Kent, the daughter of Phillip (died February 2012) and Amy (died May 2006). Her grandparents ran the Duke's Head pub on Church Street in St Paul's. Phillips attended Kingsmead Primary School. The family later moved to Southampton where Phillips completed her schooling at Millbrook Community School. After leaving school, Phillips worked for a short time at Mr Kipling's Bakery in Eastleigh, near Southampton. Phillips graduated from Birmingham Polytechnic with a BA (Hons) in English; she also undertook a PGCert in journalism.

Career

Early career
Phillips started her career in independent radio working as a reporter for local stations County Sound in Surrey, Hereward Radio and Radio Mercury in Sussex.

Moving from radio to television several years later, she joined BBC South East's Weekend programme as co-presenter, before becoming a reporter with CNN News, later moving on to become the station's entertainment editor, producing, reporting and presenting CNN News' entertainment output.

Television

Phillips has presented other programmes, including the celebrity lifestyle show OK! TV, Baby House and Room to Rent, Carlton's entertainment guide Good Stuff, LWT's Friday evening entertainment show Start the Weekend, ITV's Sunday Night and the Rich and Famous series. Phillips currently writes an opinion column in the Daily Mirror on Saturdays and works as an agony aunt in New! magazine

Phillips was a regular panellist on Loose Women in 2002, and was a guest anchor in 2004 and 2005. She returned to Loose Women as a guest anchor in March 2009 and again in March 2010.

In August 2010, she appeared as a panellist on the short-lived ITV chat show 3@Three.

She took part in the third series of Strictly Come Dancing in 2005, with professional partner Brendan Cole. The pair were voted out on Week 4 following several weeks of low scores.

Phillips had also been in the documentary The Killer in Me on 8 November 2007, a show that saw four celebrities agree to take a groundbreaking test that revealed the secret killers lurking in their genes. Phillips joined former England footballer John Barnes, political commentator and presenter Andrew Neil, and Heart FM DJ Toby Anstis who all found out their risk of developing 11 major diseases, including cancer, heart disease and Alzheimer's disease.

Phillips is a regular reporter for the BBC One consumer affairs programme Watchdog. On 19 March 2015, Phillips presented The Truth About...Sugar and on 2 June 2016, she presented The Truth About...Healthy Eating. Both programmes aired on BBC One.

GMTV

In 1993, Phillips joined GMTV as entertainment correspondent and was promoted to GMTV/Reuters Television's LA correspondent in December 1993. For over two years Phillips provided daily and weekly reports and covered a number of big news stories including the Michael Jackson alleged child molestation case, the LA earthquake, the first O.J. Simpson trial and the Oscars. She also interviewed some of the industry's biggest stars such as Leonardo DiCaprio, Clint Eastwood, Brad Pitt and Mel Gibson among others.

From 1997 to 2008, she was the main anchor on GMTV, presenting GMTV Today every Monday to Wednesday. On 28 August 2008, Phillips announced that she was to leave her role as main anchor on GMTV for family reasons. She presented her final show on 18 December 2008.

Phillips returned to GMTV in 2010 in its last series, guest presenting on GMTV with Lorraine.

Since September 2010, she has regularly guest presented the ITV Breakfast programme Lorraine (successor of GMTV with Lorraine).

Film
She voiced the character of Katie Current in the British release of Shark Tale.

Radio
Phillips hosted a show on Smooth Radio in the 2–5 pm slot every Sunday, starting from Easter Sunday, 23 March 2008, until 2009 when she left the station.

She also stood in for Simon Mayo on Radio 5 Live from 30 March to 3 April 2009.

Awards and honours
In 1996, Phillips was nominated for the Royal Television Society Interview of the Year Award.

On 7 November 2007, Phillips received an Honorary Master of Arts degree from Southampton Solent University, for "being a person distinguished in eminence and by attainments".

On 21 July 2011, Phillips received an Honorary Fellowship from Cardiff University.

Filmography

Television

Films

Personal life

Phillips is a supporter of Chelsea F.C., although she followed her home town club, Southampton F.C. when she was younger.

Philips has reported to be a vegetarian for over twenty years. However in 2015, she commented "I'm mainly vegetarian, but I have fish maybe once a month if my body feels it needs it."

Politics
Phillips is a supporter of the Labour Party. She said she had been offered a job in November 2007 as public health minister in the administration of Gordon Brown, as well as a peerage. Phillips said she declined due to her responsibilities to her two small children. She attended the 2009 Labour Party Conference in Brighton, where she introduced an address by the Home Secretary Alan Johnson. She was a panellist on BBC One's Question Time in June 2009.

Phillips is a patron of the anti-racist organisation Hope Not Hate, who have the slogan "Celebrating Britain's diverse society". In August 2014, Phillips was one of 200 public figures who were signatories to a letter to The Guardian opposing Scottish independence in the run-up to September's referendum on that issue.

Charity

Phillips is one of the judges of the Daily Mirror Pride of Britain Awards, and for presenting the GMTV Emergency Services award. She has also been one of the judges for the Children of Courage awards. From 15 October 2007, she reported from Geita, North Tanzania, for one week to visit Neema, a 13-year-old girl who Phillips has been sponsoring, and her family, friends and local schools.

On 13 March 2008, Phillips, while Age Concern Ambassador, presented the Age Concern Grandparent of the Year 2008, which took place in the Houses of Parliament. She has continued as an Ambassador for the successor charity Age UK.

References

External links

Fiona Phillips column Mirror.co.uk

1961 births
Living people
People from Canterbury
Alumni of Birmingham City University
British reporters and correspondents
English journalists
English television presenters
GMTV presenters and reporters
Labour Party (UK) people
English republicans